Rayshawn Jenkins (born January 25, 1994) is an American football safety for the Jacksonville Jaguars of the National Football League (NFL). He played college football at Miami. He was drafted by the Los Angeles Chargers in the fourth round of the 2017 NFL Draft.

Professional career
On December 5, 2016, it was announced that Jenkins had accepted his invitation to the 2017 Senior Bowl. During Senior Bowl practices, he got into a physical altercation with Grambling State's wide receiver Chad Williams. After the fight, coach Hue Jackson abruptly ended practice and addressed the South team players, stating that Jenkins and Williams had both possibly hurt their draft stock and made a poor impression. On January 28, 2017, Jenkins made two combined tackles and helped Cleveland Browns' head coach Hue Jackson's South team that defeated the North 16–15. Jenkins was one of 60 defensive backs that attended the NFL Scouting Combine in Indianapolis, Indiana. He finished ninth in the broad jump and 22nd among all defensive backs in the 40-yard dash. On March 29, 2017, Jenkins attended Miami's pro day, but opted to stand on his combine numbers and only performed the short shuttle, three-cone drill, and positional drills. During the draft process, Jenkins attended private meetings and workouts with the Minnesota Vikings and Tampa Bay Buccaneers. At the conclusion of the pre-draft process, he was projected to be a third to fifth round pick by NFL draft experts and scouts. Jenkins was ranked the fifth-best free safety by NFLDraftScout.com.

Los Angeles Chargers
The Los Angeles Chargers selected Jenkins in the fourth round (113rd overall) of the 2017 NFL Draft.

2017
On May 17, 2017, the Los Angeles Chargers signed Jenkins to a four-year, $3.06 million contract that includes a signing bonus of $662,209.

Throughout training camp, he competed against Dwight Lowery, Tre Boston, Darrell Stuckey, Dexter McCoil, and Adrian Phillips for snaps at safety. Head coach Anthony Lynn named Jenkins the third strong safety on the depth chart, behind Jahleel Addae and Adrian Phillips.

He made his professional regular season debut in the Los Angeles Chargers' 24–21 loss at the Denver Broncos. On September 24, 2017, he recorded his first career tackle on Akeem Hunt after a kick return in the second quarter of a 24–10 loss to the Kansas City Chiefs. On October 15, 2017, Jenkins recorded a season-high two solo tackles in a 21–0 victory over the Denver Broncos. He finished his rookie season with 13 combined tackles (ten solo) and a pass deflection in 15 games and zero starts.

2019
Jenkins entered the 2019 season as a starting safety following injuries to Derwin James and rookie Nasir Adderley. In Week 2 against the Detroit Lions, Jenkins recorded his first career interception off Matthew Stafford in the 13-10 loss. He finished the season leading the team in defensive snaps, recording 54 tackles, four passes defensed, and a team-leading three interceptions through 16 starts.

2020
In Week 3 of the 2020 season against the Carolina Panthers, Jenkins recorded his first career full sack on Teddy Bridgewater during the 21–16 loss.

Jacksonville Jaguars
On March 17, 2021, Jenkins signed a four-year, $35 million contract with the Jacksonville Jaguars.

2021
Jenkins entered the 2021 season as the Jaguars starting free safety. He suffered a broken ankle in Week 15 and was placed on injured reserve on December 21, 2021, ending his season. He finished the season with 73 tackles and three passes defensed through 14 starts.

2022
In Week 2 against the Indianapolis Colts, Jenkins recorded his first interception as a member of the Jaguars off a pass from Matt Ryan in the 24-0 victory.

Jenkins made two key plays that helped propel the Jaguars to a division title in the 2022 NFL season. In Week 15 against the Dallas Cowboys, Jenkins recorded a team-high 18 combined tackles and had two interceptions, one of which he returned for a touchdown in overtime to win the game for the Jaguars. In a Week 18 win-and-in game against the Tennessee Titans, with the Titans leading 16-13, Jenkins strip sacked Titans quarterback Joshua Dobbs. The fumble was recovered by teammate Josh Allen, who returned it for a touchdown to give the Jaguars a 20-16 lead. The Jaguars held on to win, thus allowing them to clinch the AFC South and a trip to the playoffs.

References

1994 births
Living people
American football safeties
Jacksonville Jaguars players
Los Angeles Chargers players
Miami Hurricanes football players
Players of American football from St. Petersburg, Florida